Francesco Giorno (born 11 October 1993) is an Italian football player. He plays for  club Piacenza on loan from Virtus Francavilla.

Club career
He made his Serie C debut for Pro Patria on 6 October 2013 in a game against San Marino.

On 4 February 2019, he joined Swiss club Chiasso on loan.

On 19 July 2019, he signed a 3-year contract with Monopoli.

On 13 January 2021, he joined Alessandria on a 2.5-year contract. After making his Serie B debut for Alessandria on 22 August 2021, on 31 August 2021 he moved to Triestina on loan.

On 17 August 2022, Giorno moved to Virtus Francavilla. On 11 January 2023, he was loaned by Piacenza.

References

External links
 

1993 births
Living people
People from Busto Arsizio
Footballers from Lombardy
Italian footballers
Association football midfielders
Serie B players
Serie C players
Serie D players
Aurora Pro Patria 1919 players
Vis Pesaro dal 1898 players
Casertana F.C. players
Parma Calcio 1913 players
Modena F.C. players
L.R. Vicenza players
A.C. Monza players
S.S. Monopoli 1966 players
U.S. Alessandria Calcio 1912 players
U.S. Triestina Calcio 1918 players
Swiss Challenge League players
FC Chiasso players
Virtus Francavilla Calcio players
Piacenza Calcio 1919 players
Italian expatriate footballers
Expatriate footballers in Switzerland
Italian expatriate sportspeople in Switzerland
Sportspeople from the Province of Varese